Sean Johnston (born 17 November 1990) is an American rally driver currently competing in World Rally Championship-2. He began his racing career in 2011 in the North American Nissan GT Academy, a televised competition that took the fastest sim racers in Gran Turismo to compete in real cars to win a professional racing contract with Nissan. After finishing second in the competition, Johnston competed in the IMSA GT3 Cup Challenge the following year, claiming 14 podiums from 15 races and winning the championship. In 2013, Johnston moved to Europe to compete in the Porsche Carrera Cup Germany and Porsche Mobil 1 Supercup. In 2018, Johnston switched to rallying, competing alongside co-driver Alex Kihurani. Johnston's first rallying win came at the 2020 Rallye Automobile Monte Carlo, where he won the RC4 class, becoming the first American with a class win at the event. Johnston and Kihurani drive the Citroën C3 Rally2 for Saintéloc Junior Team.

Career results

WRC results

* Season still in progress.

WRC-2 results

* Season still in progress.

WRC-3 results

J-WRC results

References

1990 births
Living people
American rally drivers
World Rally Championship drivers
European Rally Championship drivers

Saintéloc Racing drivers
Porsche Carrera Cup Germany drivers
American racing drivers
Porsche Supercup drivers